Owyacumish River Provincial Park is a provincial park in British Columbia, Canada.

Owyacumish River Provincial Park lies to the north of the Gardner Canal. The park is some 15 km west of Kemano Bay. The Kitamaat Village is 70 km to the southeast. The village and the city of Kitimat are the nearest settlements from the park. Although the Owyacumish River is navigable by boat, motor-powered boats are not suitable for it.

References

External links

North Coast of British Columbia
Provincial parks of British Columbia
2004 establishments in British Columbia
Protected areas established in 2004